Education for Greek people was vastly "democratized" in the 5th century B.C., influenced by the Sophists, Plato, and Isocrates. Later, in the Hellenistic period of Ancient Greece, education in a gymnasium school was considered essential for participation in Greek culture. The value of physical education to the ancient Greeks and  Romans has been historically unique. There were two forms of education in ancient Greece: formal and informal. Formal education was attained through attendance to a public school or was provided by a hired tutor.  Informal education was provided by an unpaid teacher and occurred in a non-public setting. Education was an essential component of a person's identity.

Formal Greek education was primarily for males and non-slaves. In some poleis, laws were passed to prohibit the education of slaves. The Spartans also taught music and dance, but with the purpose of enhancing their maneuverability as soldiers.

Athenian systems

Classical Athens (508–322 BCE)

Old education 

Old Education in classical Athens consisted of two major parts – physical and intellectual, or what was known to Athenians as "gymnastike" and "mousike." Gymnastike was a physical education that mirrored the ideals of the military – strength, stamina, and preparation for war. Having a physically fit body was extremely important to the Athenians. Boys would begin physical education either during or just after beginning their elementary education. Initially, they would learn from a private teacher known as a paidotribes. Eventually, the boys would begin training at the gymnasium. Physical training was seen as necessary for improving one's appearance, preparation for war, and good health at an old age. On the other hand,  mousike—literally 'the art of the Muses'—was a combination of modern-day music, dance, lyrics, and poetry. Learning how to play the lyre, and sing and dance in a chorus were central components of musical education in Classical Greece. Mousike provided students with examples of beauty and nobility, as well as an appreciation of harmony and rhythm. 

Students would write using a stylus, with which they would etch onto a wax tablet. When children were ready to begin reading whole works, they would often be given poetry to memorize and recite. Mythologies such as those of Hesiod and Homer were also highly regarded by Athenians, and their works were often incorporated into lesson plans. Old Education lacked heavy structure and only featured schooling up to the elementary level. Once a child reached adolescence his formal education ended. Therefore, a large part of this education was informal and relied on simple human experience.

Higher education 

It was not until about 420 BC that Higher Education became prominent in Athens. Philosophers such as Socrates (c. 470–399 BCE), as well as the sophistic movement, which led to an influx of foreign teachers, created a shift from Old Education to a new Higher Education. This Higher Education expanded formal education, and Athenian society began to hold intellectual capacity in higher regard than physical. The shift caused controversy between those with traditional as opposed to modern views on education. Traditionalists believed that raising "intellectuals" would destroy Athenian culture, and leave Athens at a disadvantage in war. On the other hand, those in support of the change felt that while physical strength was important, its value in relation to Athenian power would diminish over time. Such people believed that education should be a tool to develop the whole man, including his intellect. But Higher Education prevailed. The introduction of secondary and post-secondary levels of education provided greater structure and depth to the existing Old Education framework. More focused fields of study included mathematics, astronomy, harmonics and dialectic – all with an emphasis on the development of philosophical insight. It was seen as necessary for individuals to use knowledge within a framework of logic and reason.

Wealth played an integral role in classical Athenian Higher Education. In fact, the amount of Higher Education an individual received often depended on the ability and the family's willingness to pay for such an education. The formal programs within Higher Education were often taught by sophists who charged for their teaching. In fact, sophists extensively used advertisements in order to reach as many customers as possible. In most circumstances, only those who could afford the price could participate and the peasant class who lacked capital were limited in the education they could receive. Women and slaves were also barred from receiving an education. Societal expectations limited women mostly to the home, and the widely-held belief that women have inferior intellectual capacity caused them to have no access to formal education. Slaves were legally disallowed access to education. Women, while expected to stay at home and fulfill the role of a housewife, were still educated in such aspects. At about the age of seven, where boys and girls would exhibit distinct differentiation between sexes, girls were taught by their mothers the specific tasks related to a housewife as well as other moral education.

After Greece became part of the Roman Empire, educated Greeks were used as slaves by affluent Romans – indeed this was the primary way in which affluent Romans were educated. This led to the continuation of Greek culture in the Roman sphere.

Classical Athenian educators

Isocrates (436–338 BC) 
Isocrates was an influential classical Athenian orator. Growing up in Athens exposed Isocrates to educators such as Socrates and Gorgias at a young age and helped him develop exceptional rhetoric. As he grew older and his understanding of education developed, Isocrates disregarded the importance of the arts and sciences, believing rhetoric was the key to virtue. Education's purpose was to produce civic efficiency and political leadership and therefore, the ability to speak well and persuade became the cornerstone of his educational theory. However, at the time there was no definite curriculum for Higher Education, with only the existence of the sophists who were constantly traveling. In response, Isocrates founded his school of Rhetoric around 393 BCE. The school was in contrast to Plato's Academy (c. 387 BCE) which was largely based on science, philosophy, and dialectic.

Plato (428–348 BC) 

Plato was a philosopher in classical Athens who studied under Socrates, ultimately becoming one of his most famed students. Following Socrates' execution, Plato left Athens in anger, rejecting politics as a career and traveling to Italy and Sicily. He returned ten years later to establish his school, the Academy (c. 387 BCE) – named after the Greek hero Akademos. Plato perceived education as a method to produce citizens who could operate as members of the civic community in Athens. In one sense, Plato believed Athenians could obtain education through the experiences of being a community member, but he also understood the importance of deliberate training, or Higher Education, in the development of civic virtue. Thus, his reasoning behind founding the Academy – what is often credited as the first University. 

It is at this school where Plato discussed much of his educational program, which he outlined in his best-known work – the Republic. In his writing, Plato describes the rigorous process one must go through in order to attain true virtue and understand reality for what it actually is. The education required of such achievement, according to Plato, included an elementary education in music, poetry, and physical training, two to three years of mandatory military training, ten years of mathematical science, five years of dialectic training, and fifteen years of practical political training. The few individuals equipped to reach such a level would become philosopher-kings, the leaders of Plato's ideal city.

Aristotle (384–322 BC) 

Aristotle was a classical Greek philosopher. While born in Stagira, Chalkidice, Aristotle joined Plato's Academy in Athens during his late teenage years and remained there until the age of thirty-seven, withdrawing following Plato's death. His departure from the Academy also signalled his departure from Athens. Aristotle left to join Hermeias, a former student at the Academy, who had become the ruler of Atarneus and Assos in the north-western coast of Anatolia (present-day Turkey). He remained in Anatolia until, in 342 BCE, he received an invitation from King Philip of Macedon to become the educator of his thirteen-year-old son Alexander. Aristotle accepted the invitation and moved to Pella to begin his work with the boy who would soon become known as Alexander the Great. When Aristotle moved back to Athens in 352 BCE, Alexander helped finance Aristotle's school – the Lyceum. A significant part of the Lyceum was research. The school had a systematic approach to the collection of information. Aristotle believed dialectical relationships among students performing research could impede the pursuit of truth. Thus, much of the school's focus was on research done empirically.

Spartan system
The Spartan society desired that all male citizens become successful soldiers with the stamina and skills to defend their polis as members of a Spartan phalanx. It was a rumored by Plutarch, a Greek historian, that Sparta killed weak children. After examination, the council would either rule that the child was fit to live or would reject the child sentencing him to death by abandonment and exposure.

Agoge

Military dominance was of extreme importance to the Spartans of Ancient Greece.  In response, the Spartans structured their educational system as an extreme form of military boot camp, which they referred to as agoge. The pursuit of intellectual knowledge was seen as trivial, and thus academic learning, such as reading and writing, was kept to a minimum. A Spartan boy's life was devoted almost entirely to his school, and that school had but one purpose: to produce an almost indestructible Spartan phalanx. Formal education for a Spartan male began at about the age of seven when the state removed the boy from the custody of his parents and sent him to live in a barracks with many other boys his age. For all intents and purposes, the barracks was his new home, and the other males living in the barracks his family.  For the next five years, until about the age of twelve, the boys would eat, sleep and train within their barracks unit and receive instruction from an adult male citizen who had completed all of his military training and experienced battle. 

The instructor stressed discipline and exercise and saw to it that his students received little food and minimal clothing in an effort to force the boys to learn how to forage, steal and endure extreme hunger, all of which would be necessary skills in the course of a war. Those boys who survived the first stage of training entered into a secondary stage in which punishments became harsher and physical training and participation in sports almost non-stop in order to build up strength and endurance.   During this stage, which lasted until the males were about eighteen years old, fighting within the unit was encouraged, mock battles were performed, acts of courage praised, and signs of cowardice and disobedience severely punished. 

During the mock battles, the young men were formed into phalanxes to learn to maneuver as if they were one entity and not a group of individuals. To be more efficient and effective during maneuvers, students were also trained in dancing and music, because this would enhance their ability to move gracefully as a unit.   Toward the end of this phase of the agoge, the trainees were expected to hunt down and kill a Helot, a Greek slave. If caught, the student would be convicted and disciplined-not for committing murder, but for his inability to complete the murder without being discovered.

Ephebe

The students would graduate from the agoge at the age of eighteen and receive the title of ephebes. Upon becoming an ephebe, the male would pledge strict and complete allegiance to Sparta and would join a private organization to continue training in which he would compete in gymnastics, hunting and performance with planned battles using real weapons. After two years, at the age of twenty, this training was finished and the now-grown men were officially regarded as Spartan soldiers.

Education of Spartan women

Spartan women, unlike their Athenian counterparts, received a formal education that was supervised and controlled by the state.  Much of the public schooling received by the Spartan women revolved around physical education.  Until about the age of eighteen women were taught to run, wrestle, throw a discus, and also to throw javelins.  The skills of the young women were tested regularly in competitions such as the annual footrace at the Heraea of Elis,  In addition to physical education, the young girls also were taught to sing, dance, and play instruments often by traveling poets such as Alcman or by the elderly women in the polis.  The Spartan educational system for females was very strict because its purpose was to train future mothers of soldiers in order to maintain the strength of Sparta's phalanxes, which were essential to Spartan defense and culture.

Other Greek educators

Pythagoras (570–490 BCE) 

Pythagoras was one of many Greek philosophers. He lived his life on the island Samos and is known for his contributions to mathematics. Pythagoras taught philosophy of life, religion, and mathematics in his own school in Kroton, which was a Greek colony. Pythagoras' school is linked to the Pythagorean theorem, which states that the square of the hypotenuse (the side opposite the right angle) is equal to the sum of the squares of the other two sides. The students of Pythagoras were known as Pythagoreans.

Pythagoreans

Pythagoreans followed a very specific way of life. They were famous for friendship, unselfishness, and honesty. The Pythagoreans also believed in a life after the current which drove them to be people who have no attachment to personal possessions everything was communal; they were also vegetarians. The people in a Pythagorean society were known as mathematikoi (μαθηματικοί, Greek for "learners").

Teachings

There are two forms that Pythagoras taught, Exoteric and Esoteric. Exoteric was the teaching of generally accepted ideas. These courses lasted three years for mathematikoi. Esoteric was teachings of deeper meaning. These teachings did not have a time limit. They were subject to when Pythagoras thought the student was ready. In Esoteric, students would learn the philosophy of inner meanings. The focus of Pythagoras in his Exoteric teachings were ethical teachings. Here, he taught the idea of the dependence of opposites in the world; the dynamics behind the balance of opposites. 

Along with the more famous achievements, Pythagoreans were taught various mathematical ideas. They were taught the following: Pythagorean theorem, irrational numbers, five specific regular polygons, and that the earth was a sphere in the centre of the universe. Many people believed that the mathematical ideas that Pythagoras brought to the table allowed reality to be understood. Whether reality was seen as ordered or if it just had a geometrical structure. Even though Pythagoras has many contributions to mathematics, his most known theory is that things themselves are numbers. Pythagoras has a unique teaching style. He never appeared face to face to his students in the Exoteric courses. Pythagoras would set a current and face the other direction to address them. The students upon passing their education become initiated to be disciples. Pythagoras was much more intimate with the initiated and would speak to them in person. The specialty taught by Pythagoras was his theoretical teachings. In the society of Crotona, Pythagoras was known as the master of all science and brotherhood.

Rules of the school

Unlike other education systems of the time, men and women were allowed to be Pythagorean. The Pythagorean students had rules to follow such as: abstaining from beans, not picking up items that have fallen, not touching white chickens, could not stir the fire with iron, and not looking in a mirror that was beside a light.

Mathematics and music

Some of Pythagoras's applications of mathematics can be seen in his musical relationship to mathematics. The idea of proportions and ratios. Pythagoreans are known for formulating numerical concords and harmony. They put together sounds by the plucking of a string. The fact that the musician meant to pluck it at a mathematically expressible point. However, if the mathematical proportion between the points on the string were to be broken, the sound would become unsettled.

School's dictum

The Pythagorean school had a dictum that said All is number. This means that everything in the world had a number that described them. For instance, number 6 is the number that relates to creation, number 5 is the number that relates to marriage, number 4 is the number that relates to justice, number 3 is the number that relates to harmony, number 2 is the number that relates to opinion, and number 1 is the number that relates to reason.

Pythagorean Society was very secretive, the education society was based around the idea of living in peace and harmony, but secretly. Due to the education and society being so secretive, not much is known about the Pythagorean people.

See also 
 Agoge
 Scholarch
 Gymnasiarch
 Platonic Academy
 Gymnasium (ancient Greece)

Notes

References

Lynch, John P. (1972). Aristotle's School: A Study of a Greek Educational Institution. Los Angeles: University of California Press. p. 33.
Lynch. Aristotle's School. p. 36.
Sienkewicz, Joseph, ed. (2007). "Education and Training". Ancient Greece. New Jersey: Salem Press, Inc. p. 344.
Plutarch (1927). "The Training of Children". Moralia. Loeb Classical Library. p. 7.
Lynch. Aristotle's School. p. 37.
Beck, Frederick A.G. (1964). Greek Education, 450–350 B.C. London: Methuen & CO LTD. pp. 201–202.
Lynch. Aristotle's School. p. 38.
Lodge, R.C. (1970). Plato's Theory of Education. New York: Russell & Russell. p. 11.
Aristophanes, Lysistrata and Other Plays (London: Penguin Classics, 2002), 65.
Lynch. Aristotle's School. p. 38.
Plutarch The Training of Children, c. 110 CE (Ancient History Sourcebook), 5–6.
Downey, "Ancient Education," The Classical Journal 52, no.8 (May 1980): 340.
Lodge. Plato's Theory of Education. p. 304.
Lynch. Aristotle's School. p. 33.
Lynch. Aristotle's School. p. 39.
Lynch. Aristotle's School. p. 38.
O’pry, Kay (2012). "Social and Political Roles of Women in Athens and Sparta". Saber and Scroll. 1: 9.
Plutarch (1960). The Rise and Fall of Athens: Nine Greek Lives. London: Penguin Classics. pp. 168–9.
Beck. Greek Education. p. 253.
Matsen, Patricia; Rollinson, Philip; Sousa, Marion (1990). Readings from Classical Rhetoric. Edwardsville: Southern Illinois University Press. p. 43.
Beck. Greek Education. p. 255.
Beck. Greek Education. p. 257.
Beck. Greek Education. p. 293.
Beck. Greek Education. p. 227.
Beck. Greek Education. p. 200.
Beck. Greek Education. p. 240.
Lodge. Plato's Theory of Education. p. 303.
Plato (2013). Republic. Cambridge: Harvard University Press. p. 186.
Plato. Republic. p. 188.
Anagnostopoulos, Georgios, ed. (2013). "First Athenian Period". A Companion to Aristotle. Wiley-Blackwell. p. 5.
Anagnostopoulos (ed.). Companion to Aristotle. p. 8.
Anagnostopoulos (ed.). Companion to Aristotle. p. 9.
Lynch. Aristotle's School. p. 87.

Primary sources (ancient Greek)

  See original text in Perseus program.
 Lycurgus, Contra Leocratem.
 
 .
 
 .

Secondary sources

 
 
 
 
 
 
 

 
History of academia